was a former Japanese football player. He played for Furukawa Electric from 1972 to 1975 and forced to retire due to kidney problem. Post playing career he became a sports executive and served as director in the Japan Football League until 2003.

In his later years Kinomoto lost both of his legs due to health issues and died on 15 January 2017 at the age of 68.

References

1949 births
2017 deaths
Association football midfielders
Japanese footballers